Mäntsälä railway station is located in the town of Mäntsälä, Finland, approximately  from Helsinki Central railway station.

The station was opened on 3 September 2006 as part of the new Kerava-Lahti railway line, and is served by the Z-trains which run on this route.

Services 

  commuter trains (Helsinki –Pasila – Tikkurila – Kerava – Haarajoki – Mäntsälä – Henna – Lahti)
 Additional stops following Lahti during rush hours and late at night: Villähde – Nastola – Uusikylä – Kausala – Koria – Kouvola

External links

References 

Railway station
Railway stations in Uusimaa
Railway stations opened in 2006